Fifes Peaks  is a compact group of summits and spires from an eroded volcanic cone located in Yakima County in Washington state. Fifes Peaks is situated in the Cascade Range on the east side of the crest, within the Norse Peak Wilderness. The Fifes Peaks are remnants of a now extinct caldera which exploded 25 million years ago with volcanic activity extending from 20 to 30 million years ago.

Principal summits

 Fifes Peaks West Peak - 6,880+ ft
 Fifes Peaks Central Peak- 6,793 ft
  Fifes Peaks East Peak - 6,375 ft
 Mainmast - 6,400+ ft
 Cannonhole Pinnacle - 6,600+ ft
 Teddy Bear Pinnacle - 6260 ft

History

Fifes Peaks were named for Thomas X. Fife (1853-1922), a placer miner. Thomas, his brothers, and their father John, mined in the area near Chinook Pass. Tom homesteaded at Goose Prairie, near Bumping Lake. Camp Fife, the Boy Scout Camp at Goose Prairie, also honors Tom Fife because he willed the land to the Boy Scouts.

Climate
Most weather fronts originate in the Pacific Ocean, and travel east toward the Cascade Mountains. As fronts approach, they are forced upward by the peaks of the Cascade Range (Orographic lift), causing them to drop their moisture in the form of rain or snowfall onto the Cascades. As a result, the west side of the Cascades experiences high precipitation, especially during the winter months in the form of snowfall. During winter months, weather is usually cloudy, but, due to high pressure systems over the Pacific Ocean that intensify during summer months, there is often little or no cloud cover during the summer. Precipitation runoff from Fifes Peaks drains into tributaries of the American River and Naches River.

Gallery

References

External links

 Fifes Peaks weather forecast

Cascade Range
Landforms of Yakima County, Washington
Mountains of Yakima County, Washington
Volcanoes of Washington (state)
Calderas of Washington (state)
Oligocene calderas